Étalans is a commune in the Doubs department in the Bourgogne-Franche-Comté region in eastern France. On 1 January 2017, the former communes of Charbonnières-les-Sapins and Verrières-du-Grosbois were merged into Étalans.

Population

See also
 Communes of the Doubs department

References

Communes of Doubs